The Madjandji, also known as the Majañji, are indigenous Australian people in the area south of Cairns in the state of Queensland.

Language
The Madjandji spoke Madjay, now classified as a dialect of Yidiny.

Country
Their inland extension to the west lay at Babinda. Their northern limits approached Deeral. The Madjandji had close ties to the Wanjuru people to their south.

Alternative names
 Matjai. (language name)
 Matjandji.
 Madyay (?)
 Majay
 Mooka.

Notes

Citations

Sources

Aboriginal peoples of Queensland